"Sandstorm" is an instrumental by Finnish DJ and record producer Darude. It was released as the lead single from his debut studio album, Before the Storm. It was initially released in Finland on 26 October 1999 by 16 Inch Records and was later re-released in many other countries in 2000. The track was uploaded to MP3.com where it gained global recognition. It has also gained recognition for its usage in sports and popularity in internet meme culture.

On 1 March 2010, over ten years after its original release, "Sandstorm" was certified Gold in the United States by the Recording Industry Association of America for sales of over 500,000 copies. In January 2020, it was certified Platinum for sales over one million.

On the centenary of Finland's independence in 2017, celebrations in Helsinki included Darude as one of the main performers with his "Sandstorm".

Background

Darude first started making happy hardcore with a music tracker program on his computer, playing gigs as "Rudeboy". He then performed with Wille "Weirdness" Heikkilä as "Position 1", making light Eurodance tunes, and he paired with other DJs on other projects. In September–October 1999 as Darude he began collaborating with Jaakko "JS16" Salovaara, known as the producer of the Bomfunk MC's. "Sandstorm" was the first product of the collaboration, ready after about a week of work. JS16 signed Darude as the first artist on JS16's new label 16 Inch Records.

Darude had been uploading various pieces of his trance experimentation on the website MP3.com, where he was building a following, and he also uploaded the full-length demo of "Sandstorm". This exposure was responsible for worldwide interest in "Sandstorm". In 2000, Darude reported on his mp3.com artist's page that he had "removed the full-length tracks" of "Sandstorm" at the request of his record company.

The title of the instrumental originates from the Roland JP-8080 synthesizer used in the song, which displays the text "sand storm" on startup.

In a 2016 Reddit AMA interview, Darude admitted that he had never experienced an actual sandstorm but had experienced a dust devil.

Composition
"Sandstorm" is an instrumental trance composition. According to Darude, the hardware and software used to make the track are as follows: P2, Cubase VST 32, FastTracker 2, ReBirth, Korg TR-Rack. Then with JS16 in his studio: Cubase on Atari 1040ST, Ensoniq ASR-10 sampler, Roland JP8080, NordLead2, Roland JV2080, Ensoniq DP4, Mackie 24/8, Behringer rack compressor.

Music video
The video for "Sandstorm" features Darude with headphones viewing two armed security guards (a man and a woman) chasing a woman with a case. Darude seems to appear at every place where the pursuers and the pursued go. Near the end, the woman with the case stumbles and one of her pursuers (the other woman) betrays her partner, knocking him out. The two women take the case onto a boat with Darude. As of January 2023, the music video uploaded on YouTube via an official channel has garnered over 243 million views, while one unofficial upload has 53 million views.

The video was directed by Juuso Syrjä, a.k.a. Uzi, and was shot in various places in Helsinki, including the Helsinki Cathedral and the Senate Square. It became the first Finnish music video shown on MTV in the US and it received several awards in Finland and on MTV.

Usage in media

In film and television
"Sandstorm" appeared on the pilot episode of popular Showtime series Queer as Folk, which first aired on 3 December 2000. "Sandstorm" was also used in the 2001 Finnish film Tango Cabaret (Tango Kabaree). In the third part of the Johnny English film series, Johnny English Strikes Again, the title character played by Rowan Atkinson dances to the beat of "Sandstorm" in a dance club scene.  "Sandstorm" was used in Season 3, Episode 10, of The Orville on Hulu in the Bachelorette Party scene with the dancing robot before Dr. Claire Finn's marriage to Isaac the Kaylon.

In sports
In the late 2000s, a marketing executive for the University of South Carolina added "Sandstorm" to the playlist of music at Williams-Brice Stadium during a Gamecocks football game. In a 2021 ESPN story, the executive recalled that he had tried using the track when he was employed at Vanderbilt University, but the Vanderbilt fanbase did not react strongly to it. After moving to South Carolina, he played the track at one football game, and received a fan reaction good enough that he decided to save it for a key moment in a later game. That moment would come in the last two minutes of a 2009 game against Ole Miss, when "Sandstorm" was played before back-to-back Gamecocks defensive plays that sealed an upset win over Ole Miss. Since that game, it has become a rallying anthem for South Carolina fans. The track is not only used at football games, but at many other South Carolina sports events, and has become so iconic among Gamecocks fans that some have even used it at their weddings.

Professional wrestlers Toru Owashi and Session Moth Martina as well as mixed martial artist Wanderlei Silva, and baseball pitcher Koji Uehara use "Sandstorm" as entrance music. It was also played at the 2006 Winter Olympics, and during the Ice Hockey World Championships. Nike used the composition in an advertisement series featuring the basketball opponents Kobe Bryant and LeBron James. Kansas State University briefly used "Sandstorm" at men's basketball games, but banned it after the school's student section punctuated the track with chants of "F--- KU!" during games against archrival Kansas; the school has more recently tried reintroducing it.

In video games
On May 5, 2022, "Sandstorm" was included in the popular VR game Beat Saber, through their "Electronic Mixtape" DLC.
Because of this, Darude became the first "Eurovision Song Contest" participant to feature one of their songs in the game.

Internet phenomenon
The popularity of "Sandstorm" as background music for those who stream their video gaming on the Twitch platform led to a meme that any question asking for the name of any song was replied to with the comment "Darude – Sandstorm."

As an April Fools' Day joke on 1 April 2015, YouTube displayed the message "Did you mean: Darude – Sandstorm by Darude" for all video search queries that involve music, in addition to adding a button which played the song during a video.

Track listings

Chart performance
Soon after release, "Sandstorm" became popular on pop radio stations, reaching number one in Norway. Its sales worldwide eventually reached 2 million, and it was featured on 200 compilations.

Weekly charts

Year-end charts

Certifications

Release history

See also
List of number-one songs in Norway

References

Bibliography

External links

1999 debut singles
1999 songs
1990s instrumentals
2000 singles
2010s fads and trends
Canadian Singles Chart number-one singles
Darude songs
Internet memes introduced in 2014
Number-one singles in Norway
South Carolina Gamecocks football
Trance instrumentals
UK Independent Singles Chart number-one singles